This list is of the Cultural Properties of Japan designated in the category of  for the Prefecture of Ishikawa.

National Cultural Properties
As of 1 September 2015, eleven Important Cultural Properties have been designated, being of national significance.

Prefectural Cultural Properties
As of 14 March 2015, fifty-three properties have been designated at a prefectural level.

See also
 Cultural Properties of Japan
 List of National Treasures of Japan (paintings)
 Japanese painting
 List of Historic Sites of Japan (Ishikawa)

References

External links
  Cultural Properties in Ishikawa Prefecture

Cultural Properties,Ishikawa
Cultural Properties,Paintings
Paintings,Ishikawa
Lists of paintings